The Vishnudharmottara Purana (or the Vishnudharmottara) is a Hindu Sanskrit text in the Upapuranas genre. Like the Mahapuranas, it is also encyclopedic covering a wide range of secular and religious topics in the traditions of Hinduism. It is included in the list of eighteen Upapuranas given in the Brihaddharma Purana (1.25.23-26).

History 
It is most celebrated for Chitrasutras constituting chapters 35–43 of the third khanda (book). This much cited part of the text dates from the Gupta period of Indian history.

The Chitrasutra section of the Vishnudharmottara Purana has been discovered in manuscripts all over India and Nepal in Devanagari, Sharada, Bengali, and Newari scripts. The compilation that has survived into the modern age was likely complete by the 5th or 6th-century CE according to David Pingree. It is one of the oldest known complete Sanskrit treatises on painting arts in India.

Content 
The Vishnudharmottara Purana is a Vaishnava-tradition text. It includes mythology and dharma legends, has sections on cosmology, cosmogony, geography, astronomy, astrology, division of time, genealogies (mostly of kings and sages), manners and customs, charity, penances, law and politics, war strategies, medicines and their preparation for human beings and animals, cuisine, grammar, metrics, lexicography, metrics, rhetoric, dramaturgy, dance, vocal and instrumental music, and arts.

The extant text is divided into three khandas (parts). The first khanda comprises 269 adhyayas (chapters), the second khanda comprises 183 adhyayas and the third khanda comprises 118 adhyayas.

The third khanda 
Chapter 1 of the third khanda deals with the origin of image making and the interdependence of arts. 

Chapters 2-17 deal with grammar, lexicography, metrics, and rhetoric. 

Chapters 18-19 deal with vocal and instrumental music.  

Chapters 20-34 deal with dance and dramaturgy. 

Chapters 35-43 give an account of the various branches, methods, and ideals of Indian painting. It deals not only with its religious aspect but also, and to a far greater extent, with its secular employment. It "proclaims the joy that colours and forms and the representation of things seen and imagined produce". This aphoristic treatise on painting has attracted much bhasya (commentary) literature in Hinduism over the centuries. All or parts of this treatise has been translated in English by Stella Kramrisch, C Sivaramamurti, Parul Mukherji, and Isabella Nardeli.

Chapters 44-85 deal with Pratimalakshana (iconography). Chapters 86-93 deal with temple construction. Chapters 94-108 deal with avahana (induction of deities into images). Chapters 109-118 deal with rites and rituals.  

Stella Kramrisch says that while the Vishnu Purana cannot be earlier than the second half of the 4th century CE, the chapters of the Vishnudharmottara that deal with painting must have been compiled in the 7th century CE.

References

Bibliography

External links 
  - via Internet Archive

Puranas
Vaishnava texts
Hindu art
Hindu iconography